Sir John Hunter (13 February 1751 – 3 July 1816) was a British statesman serving as Consul-General in Madras, India, and both Seville and St Lucar, Spain.

Born in Edinburgh, Scotland to James Hunter, he married Margaret Congalton in 1787, daughter of Dr. Charles Congalton. Upon her death in 1791, Hunter married Dame Elizabeth Barbara Arbuthnot in 1793, daughter of Robert Keith Arbuthnot FRSE (1728-1803) of Haddo Rattray, and sister of Sir William Arbuthnot, 1st Baronet of Edinburgh FRSE.

He was knighted by the Prince Regent on 10 December 1813.

He is the father, through his first marriage, of Margaret Congalton Hunter, spouse of Captain Basil Hall.

References

 Memories of the Arbuthnots, Mrs P S-M Arbuthnot 1920

1816 deaths
British diplomats
1751 births